Värtsilä is a former municipality of Finland. It merged with Tohmajärvi in 2005. The border crossing Niirala towards Vyartsilya is here.

Värtsilä was located in the province of Eastern Finland and was part of the North Karelia region.

The main language spoken in Värtsilä is Finnish but new settlers from Russia and people evacuated from the lost Karelian areas after the Second World War form Russian and Karelian speaking minorities.

In addition to the current village, Värtsilä used to include the urban settlement of Vyartsilya, which since 1944 has belonged to Russia.

The biggest employers in the village include the Finnish Border Guard and Finnish Customs.

References

External links

Populated places disestablished in 2005
Former municipalities of Finland